Red Oak High School may refer to:

Red Oak High School (Iowa), Red Oak, Iowa
Red Oak High School (Oklahoma), Red Oak, Oklahoma
Red Oak High School (Texas), Red Oak, Texas